Jim Greene (born 1950) is an Irish retired hurler who played as a full-forward for the Waterford senior team.

Greene joined the team in 1968 and became a regular player until his retirement in 1986.  During that time he appeared in numerous Munster finals but ended his career without any major honours. He won an All-Star award in 1982. He also lined out for Waterford in the minor and under-21 grades.

At club level Greene enjoyed a successful career with Mount Sion, winning a Munster club winners' medal and eight county club championship winners medal.

References

1950 births
Living people
Mount Sion hurlers
Waterford inter-county hurlers
Munster inter-provincial hurlers
Hurling managers